Margaret Fong Shun-man (born 8 December 1962), is the Executive Director of the Hong Kong Trade Development Council (HKTDC) and is responsible for the HKTDC's worldwide operations.

Education
Miss Fong graduated from the University of Hong Kong with a BA in English Literature and then attended Oxford University.

Civil service
She joined the civil service in August 1985 and rose to her present rank of Administrative Officer Staff Grade A in April 2008. Miss Fong has served in a number of bureaux and departments, including:

 the former Administrative Service and Information Branch
 the former City and New Territories Administration
 the former Government House
 the former Finance Branch
 the former Constitutional Affairs Branch

Miss Fong has also served in a number of senior positions in recent years, including:

 Deputy Director-General, Hong Kong Economic and Trade Affairs, Washington (August 1997 to September 1999)
 Deputy Secretary for Transport (later retitled Deputy Secretary for Environment, Transport and Works (Transport)) (October 1999 to June 2004)
 Director-General, Hong Kong Economic and Trade Affairs, Washington (August 2004 to July 2006)
 Commissioner for Economic & Trande Affairs, USA (July 2006 to October 2008) 
 Commissioner for Tourism (November 2008 to Dec 2009)

References 
 

Government officials of Hong Kong
1962 births
Living people
Alumni of the University of Hong Kong
Alumni of the University of Oxford